Staromuraptalovo (İśke Moraptal) is a rural locality (a village) in Muraptalovsky Selsoviet, Kuyurgazinsky District, Bashkortostan, Russia. The population was 380 as of 2010. There are 6 streets.

Geography 
Staromuraptalovo is located 36 km south of Yermolayevo (the district's administrative centre) by road. Novomuraptalovo is the nearest rural locality.

References 

Rural localities in Kuyurgazinsky District